Marek Eben (born 18 December 1957) is a Czech actor, singer, composer, writer and television host.

Career
Eben studied music and drama at the Prague Conservatory. His father, Petr Eben, and his uncle Ilja Hurník were both composers. With his brothers Kryštof and David, he formed a band "Bratři Ebenové" (Eben Brothers) in 1984, with Marek as the writer, composer and singer.

Eben has won a number of awards for his work as a TV presenter. His presenting work includes the Czech version of Dancing with the Stars, and the long-running Czech Television talk show Na plovárně ("At the swimming-pool"), in which he interviews celebrities from all over the world. He also participates in the organization of the Karlovy Vary International Film Festival. He is openly Christian, and is known for his polite interviewing style.

References

External links
 

1957 births
Living people
Czech male stage actors
Czech television personalities
Czech Roman Catholics
Prague Conservatory alumni
Male actors from Prague
Czech male television actors
Czech musicians
20th-century Czech male actors
21st-century Czech male actors